Perpetual Motion People is a 2015 album by Ezra Furman.

Critical reception

According to Metacritic, Perpetual Motion People has a score of 80 out of 100, indicating that it has received "generally favorable reviews" from critics.

Accolades

Track listing 
 "Restless Year"
 "Lousy Connection"
 "Hark! To the Music"
 "Haunted Head"
 "Hour of Deepest Need"
 "Wobbly"
 "Ordinary Life"
 "Tip of a Match"
 "Body Was Made"
 "Watch You Go By"
 "Pot Holes"
 "Can I Sleep in Your Brain?" 
 "One Day I Will Sin No More"

References

2015 albums
Bella Union albums